Emporia High School is a public secondary school in Emporia, Kansas, United States.  It is the sole high school operated by Emporia USD 253 school district, and serves students of grades 9 to 12.  Emporia has an enrollment of approximately 1,400 students and a teaching staff of 130. The principal is Dathan Fischer. The school mascot is the Spartan and the school colors are red and black.

Emporia High was established in the early 1900s in order to help educate the increasing population of Emporia. Emporia High is a member of the Kansas State High School Activities Association and offers a variety of sports programs. Athletic teams compete in the 5A division and are known as the "Spartans". Extracurricular activities are also offered in the form of performing arts, school publications, and clubs.

Extracurricular activities
The Spartans compete in the Centennial League and are classified as a 5A school, the second-largest classification in Kansas according to the Kansas State High School Activities Association. Throughout its history, Emporia has won several state championships in various sports. Many graduates have gone on to participate in collegiate athletics.

Wrestling
Emporia's wrestling team has been successful for many years, having won eleven team state championships in 1980, 1983, 1984, 1987, 1988, 1989, 1995, 1996, 2000, 2009, and 2010. As of 2013, the Spartans have been the Centennial League Champions for 30 consecutive years.

Cross country

Emporia's cross country team has won the state title 5 times, occurring in 1969, 1988, 1991, 1993, and 2007.

State championships

Notable alumni
 Clint Bowyer - NASCAR driver
 Clarence Clay Jr. - geophysicist specialized in oceanography.
 Dale Corson - 8th President of Cornell University
 Tex Johnston - Test pilot
 J. L. Lewis - professional golfer on the PGA Tour
 Evan Lindquist - Artist, Printmaker, Arkansas Artist Laureate
 John Lohmeyer - NFL player
 Brock Pemberton - Broadway producer, originator of the Tony Awards
 Harold See - former Associate Justice of the Alabama Supreme Court
 Dean Smith - former Hall of Fame basketball coach for the North Carolina Tar Heels
 Oscar Stauffer - founder of Stauffer Communications. 
 Grant Timmerman - World War II Medal of Honor recipient

References

External links
 

Emporia, Kansas
Public high schools in Kansas
Schools in Lyon County, Kansas
1864 establishments in Kansas